Witts is a surname. Notable people with the surname name include:

Andrew Witts (born 1961), Australian rules footballer 
David Witts (born  1991), British actor and model
Francis Edward Witts (1783–1854), English clergyman, diarist, and magistrate
Garry Witts (born 1959),  American former basketball player
George Backhouse Witts (1846–1912), British civil engineer and archaeologist
Leslie John Witts (1898–1982), British physician

See also
Witt (disambiguation)
Wits (disambiguation)
Witz (disambiguation)